Copec or COPEC may refer to:

 Conference on Politics, Economics and Citizenship, a house improvement society founded by Florence Mary Barrow
 Côte d'Ivoire – Ghana Cocoa Initiative (CIGCI), a cocoa cartel
 Empresas Copec, a Chilean energy and forestry company

See also
 Copeck